The name of Steen Andersen Bille is closely associated with one extended family of Danish naval officers over several generations.

In a direct line from one Vice-Commandant of the City of Copenhagen in the later 17th century, a long list of distinguished Danish naval officers emerged – including six admirals, two commanders and six captains.  Many of these had the same name as their progenitor.

Progenitor
Colonel and Vice-Commandant of Copenhagen, Steen Andersen  Bille (1624–1698).

Family tree

List
 Bendix Lasson Bille (23 November 1723 – 5 October 1784), rear admiral.
 Daniel Ernst Bille (7 April 1711 – 25 February 1790), rear admiral.
 Daniel Ernst Bille (22 September 1770 – 24 February 1807), captain.
 Ernst Wilhelm Bille (9 September 1795 – 15 March 1821), senior lieutenant; unmarried.
 Just Bille (1670–1749), captain.
 Just Bille (13 March 1744 – 17 January 1802), commander; no issue.
 Mathias Bille (17 February 1736 – 17 March 1782), captain
 Michael Bille (14 May 1680 – 2 May 1756), admiral.
 Michael Johannes Petronius Bille (8 November 1769 – 27 March 1845), rear admiral.
 Steen Andersen Bille (1624–1698), colonel.
 Steen Andersen Bille (27 March 1725 – 23 September 1748), junior lieutenant; unmarried.
 Steen Andersen Bille (23 August 1751 – 15 April 1833), admiral; actions: Action of 16 May 1797, Battle of Copenhagen, Gunboat War.
 Steen Andersen Bille (5 December 1797 – 2 May 1883), vice admiral.
 Steen Andersen Bille (24 July 1830 – 3 June 1905), captain.
 Søren Adolph Bille (4 June 1775 – 12 September 1819), captain.

Others

Family burial plot

Many members of the Bille family from Steen Andersen Bille (1751–1833) and his wife onwards are buried at the Cemetery of Holmen (Danish: Holmens Kirkegård) in Copenhagen.

Bille
Two ships have been named Bille in relatively recent times in the Royal Danish Navy:
 Bille (1946) a torpedo boat with a speed of 29 knots. Decommissioned 1959 
 Bille (1976) a Willemoes-class torpedo boat, later fitted with two harpoon missiles. Named after Admiral S A Bille (1751–1833)

Notes

References

Citations

T. A. Topsøe-Jensen og Emil Marquard (1935) “Officerer i den dansk-norske Søetat 1660-1814 og den danske Søetat 1814-1932“.  Volume 1 and Volume 2

Balsved - Danish Naval History website

Royal Danish Navy officers
Steen
17th-century births
17th-century deaths
Military families of Denmark